P&O Cruises Australia is a British-American owned cruise line with operational headquarters as part of Carnival Australia, based in Chatswood, New South Wales, Australia.

Originally a sister company of P&O Cruises in the United Kingdom, it was previously a constituent of the Peninsular & Oriental Steam Navigation Company and has a direct link in history to the world's first cruise ships. As such, it is one of the oldest cruise lines in the world, and now forms part of the Carnival Corporation & plc, managed locally by Carnival Australia. It currently operates three ships, sailing from various ports in Australia and New Zealand.

History

Beginnings 
P&O Cruises Australia originates from the passenger division of the Peninsular and Oriental Steam Navigation Company, a UK shipping company which operated the world's first passenger ships in the early 19th century. P&O subsequently became the first company to operate passenger routes to Australia, with the first of these voyages occurring in 1932. These passenger voyages evolved into cruise holidays that lead to P&O adopting the brand name of P&O Cruises, with the Australian service eventually becoming P&O Cruises Australia.

1980s–2002: Growing presence and P&O Princess Cruises 

In the 1980s, P&O sustained its operations in Australia with the help of SS Oriana, which was transferred to the Australian market in the 1980s. In 1988, P&O Group purchased Sitmar Cruises in 1988, after which it branded TSS Fairstar under the P&O Holidays Australia banner. In 1997, Fairstar was replaced by SS Fair Princess, which was transferred from sister brand Princess Cruises and sailed for P&O until 2001.

In 2000, after various changes in the organisation of the P&O Group, the company de-merged all of its cruise ship operations. As a result, the Australian operations of P&O Cruises were split off into their own cruise line, creating P&O Cruises Australia. A new company, P&O Princess Cruises, was created, which was independent of P&O and consisted of P&O Cruises, P&O Cruises Australia, Princess Cruises, AIDA Cruises, and later, A'Rosa Cruises and Ocean Village.

2003–present: Carnival Corporation & plc 
In April 2003, P&O Princess Cruises merged with Carnival Corporation to form Carnival Corporation & plc, the world's largest cruise company, with a portfolio of eleven cruise lines at the time, including P&O Cruises Australia.

In October 2009, P&O offered assistance to the Red Cross in relief efforts for earthquake and tsunami victims in the South Pacific by donating 740 pillows with the promise of mattresses, more pillows and hundreds of light bulbs to be given a later date.

In January 2020, Carnival Foundation, the Micky and Madeleine Arison Family Foundation, and five Carnival Corporation & plc cruise line brands – P&O Cruises Australia, Carnival Cruise Line, Cunard Line, Holland America Line, and Princess Cruises – collectively pledged over US$1.25 million to support disaster recovery efforts from the bushfires that caused widespread devastation throughout Australia. Later, during the COVID-19 pandemic, P&O became embroiled in a controversy with the New South Wales Police Force after the NSW Police Force ordered Pacific Explorer to leave Australian waters on 2 April 2020, a move that P&O president Sture Myrmell claimed was an "unprecedented" action taken against the cruise line after noting that the ship never harbored any coronavirus cases and that P&O had regularly contributed greatly to the Australian economy. The edict had ordered a total of six cruise ships off the coast of New South Wales to leave Australian waters and was additionally enforced by the Australian Defence Force to supervise logistics and compliance. The order came after NSW Police Commissioner Mick Fuller accused the remaining vessels of delaying their departure and feared any new outbreaks on the vessels would overwhelm NSW's health system.

In September 2021, Carnival Australia announced Marguerite Fitzgerald will take over Stuart Myrmell as president of Carnival Australia and P&O Australia.

Fleet timeline 
Since its inception, P&O Cruises Australia has not received any newbuild vessels but has used ships transferred from its sister brands.

Additions to the Fleet 
In 2001, Princess Cruises' Sky Princess was redeployed to Australia to become Pacific Sky, the first modern ship in the fleet. In 2004, Pacific Sun joined the fleet, and was quickly followed by Pacific Star in 2005. In October 2007, the oldest ship of Princess Cruises' fleet, Regal Princess, was transferred to P&O, and after one month of refurbishment, entered service as Pacific Dawn.

On 30 October 2008, Carnival Corporation announced the closure of their United Kingdom-based Ocean Village brand. Coinciding with this closure, both Ocean Village ships were transferred to the fleet of P&O. Ocean Village Two joined the fleet in December 2009 as Pacific Jewel. Ocean Village followed in late 2010 as Pacific Pearl. With this development, P&O Australia doubled its fleet to four ships, the biggest investment made by a company operating within the Australian cruise industry thus far.

In May 2014, Carnival Corporation announced that its brand, Holland America Line, would transfer Statendam and Ryndam into the P&O Australia fleet in 2015 after being refurbished and tailored for Australian and New Zealand passengers. The names for the two ships were revealed in July 2014 as Pacific Eden and Pacific Aria.

In March 2015, Carnival Corporation and Fincantieri made an agreement for five ships to be delivered between 2019 and 2022. On 30 December 2015, Carnival Corporation established that, from the agreement, the planned 4,200-passenger ship ordered would be delivered to P&O, making her the first newbuild for P&O and the largest ship to be operated by an Australian cruise company. But on 15 December 2016, Carnival Corporation announced that US. brand, Carnival Cruise Line, would receive a third Vista-class vessel, meaning the original order for P&O Australia was transferred over to Carnival Cruise Line. Instead, Carnival Splendor was scheduled to be transferred to P&O in late 2019 to compensate for the lost order. However, in September 2017, with the news announced of Golden Princess moving to P&O Australia, Carnival Splendor was no longer scheduled to move to the Australian brand.

In October 2015 it was announced that the Dawn Princess would transfer from the Princess Cruises fleet to the P&O Australia fleet. She was renamed Pacific Explorer upon her debut in June 2017.

In September 2017, P&O announced that Princess Cruises would transfer Grand-class ship, Golden Princess, into the fleet in 2020 to replace the much smaller Pacific Eden which exited the fleet in April 2019. In September 2018, her new name was announced as Pacific Adventure, a name chosen by six P&O Cruises Australia fans on its Facebook page. She will also have an increase in passenger capacity by 500 to 3,100. Pacific Adventure is scheduled to debut in October 2020 and be homeported in Sydney.

In August 2018, it was announced that Princess was scheduled to transfer a second Grand-class vessel, Star Princess, into the P&O fleet in late-2021 to replace Pacific Jewel which departed the fleet in March 2019. Following the exits of Pacific Dawn and Pacific Aria and the debuts of Pacific Adventure and Pacific Encounter, P&O's fleet of three ships will total a guest capacity of approximately 9,000 guests. On 25 November 2019, it was revealed that Star Princess would be renamed Pacific Encounter upon beginning operations for P&O.

Fleet disposals 
In 2006, Pacific Sky was sold to Pullmantur Cruises and renamed Sky Wonder. On 30 May 2007, Pacific Star was also sold to Pullmantur Cruises. She underwent refurbishment in Singapore and began sailing as Ocean Dream from 11 May 2008.

In December 2011, P&O announced Pacific Sun would make her last journey for the company on 1 July 2012 and leave the fleet shortly thereafter. She was sold to HNA Group's HNA Cruises to become Henna and began operating under her new name on 26 January 2013.

In March 2016, P&O announced that Pacific Pearl would leave the fleet in March 2017. She joined Cruise & Maritime Voyages (CMV) and was renamed Columbus, debuting on 9 June 2017.

In March 2018, P&O announced Pacific Eden would leave the fleet in April 2019. She joined CMV and was renamed Vasco da Gama, debuting on 22 April 2019.

On 22 August 2018, P&O announced Pacific Jewel would leave the fleet in March 2019 after ten years with the cruise line, with her final voyage on 24 February 2019. She was sold to Jalesh Cruises and renamed Karnika in April 2019.

On 25 November 2019, P&O announced the exits of Pacific Dawn and Pacific Aria for March 2021 and May 2021, respectively. On 28 November 2019, CMV announced that it had purchased both Pacific Dawn and Pacific Aria, with Pacific Dawn scheduled to enter the fleet as Amy Johnson on 2 March 2021 for the UK market, and Pacific Aria scheduled to enter the fleet of CMV subsidiary Transocean Tours as Ida Pfeiffer on 2 May 2021, for the German market. However, Cruise & Maritime Voyages entered administration in July 2020, as a result the transfers didn't go ahead.

Fleet

Current fleet

Former fleet

References

External links 

 

 
Carnival Corporation & plc
Cruise lines
P&O (company)